Indirect presidential elections were held in Brazil on 15 October 1978. The opposition Brazilian Democratic Movement (MDB) chose an anti-candidate to fill the spot and denounce the restrictive democracy. The MDB chose General Euler Bentes Monteiro to run against João Figueiredo from the National Renewal Alliance Party. Figueiredo won with 355 electoral votes against 226 votes for Euler Monteiro.

Results

References

Presidential elections in Brazil
Brazil
President
October 1978 events in South America